Rosemary Aluoch (5 July 1976 – 4 October 2020) was a Kenyan footballer who played goalkeeper.

Biography
Aluoch played for the Kenyan women's team from 1995 to 2014. She also played for numerous football clubs in Kenya, the Democratic Republic of the Congo, Uganda, and Burundi. She joined the staff of the Kenyan women's team in 2015, serving as a goalkeepers' coach.

Rosemary Aluoch died in Kasarani on 4 October 2020 at the age of 44.

See also
List of Kenya women's international footballers

References

1976 births
2020 deaths
Kenyan women's footballers
Women's association football goalkeepers
Kenya women's international footballers